Alexisonfire (pronounced "Alexis on Fire") is a Canadian post-hardcore band formed in St. Catharines, Ontario in 2001. The band's members are George Pettit (vocals), Dallas Green (vocals, guitar,  keyboards), Wade MacNeil  (guitar, vocals), Chris Steele (bass) and Jordan Hastings (drums, percussion). The band has won numerous awards, and in Canada their albums have all been certified either gold or platinum.

History

Alexisonfire (2001–2003)

Alexisonfire was formed in late 2001 in the aftermath of a three-band break up. Pettit was playing guitar in a metal band called Condemning Salem, Green was lead singer and guitar player in Helicon Blue, and MacNeil and Steele played in a punk band called Plan 9. These bands broke up at the same time, and Pettit, Steele, MacNeil and Green recruited drummer Jesse Ingelevics, and formed Alexisonfire. The band's name was derived from Alexis Fire. When Fire discovered that they were using her website name as their band name, she threatened to sue, but it was discovered that the moniker was not registered, and no further action took place.

In 2002, the band released its first EP, Math Sheets Demo, so named because the CD was wrapped in Jesse Ingelevics' math homework. This caught the attention of recording engineer Greg Below and Montreal journalist Mitch Joel, who were setting up the record label Distort Entertainment and were looking for artists. Below was also working with EMI, which allowed the band to record at the company's in-house studio, and land a co-publishing and distribution deal.

On October 31, 2002, Alexisonfire was released. Although there was a distribution deal with EMI, the album's success was mostly attributed to word-of-mouth. They had already been playing dates in Ontario and New York with bands like GWAR, Juliana Theory and Glassjaw;  2003 saw them touring in support of the album, crossing Canada twice, playing with Spitalfield and Billy Talent, appearing at Hellfest, and touring Europe with Rise Against.

In October 2005, Alexisonfire was certified gold in Canada, marking over 50,000 sales.  (In 2014, Dine Alone Records released a remastered version of the album.)

At the 2004 Canadian Independent Music Awards, the video for the album's song "Pulmonary Archery" won Best Video. They were named Favourite Indie Band at the CASBY Awards, and the video for the song "Counterparts and Number Them" was nominated for Best Independent Video at the MuchMusic Video Awards.

Watch Out! (2004–2005)

Alexisonfire recorded their second album with Julius Butty at his Silo Studios near Hamilton, Ontario, Watch Out! and was released on June 29, 2004. It was released worldwide, mainly through Distort but through Equal Vision Records in the USA, and Sorepoint Records in the UK. It debuted at No. 6 on the Nielsen Soundscan Top 200, sold 6,000 copies in its first week, received gold certification in Canada in twelve weeks, and certified platinum in 2007. The critical reception came from the fact that the band was more focused from the eighteen months of touring, helping them harness more aggression, release more emotion, and fine-tune all the tracks. The album was noted as a real departure from their debut album, and was a critical success.

As soon as the album was released, the band went on tour, playing the Vans Warped Tour on several US dates, and then heading to the UK, playing the Reading and Leeds Festivals and other British gigs. (While playing Glasgow with Johnny Truant and The Blood Roses in, the members of all three bands had the word "Yeti" tattooed on themselves. On an episode of the MuchMusic program The New Music, Pettit and Green said that the idea for the tattoos came from the 1988 Gary Oldman film The Firm.) The band spent all of 2005 on the road, touring the UK, US, Canada and Europe. They also played the Summer Sonic Festival in Japan.

On June 14, 2005, Alexisonfire posted a statement on their website stating that founding drummer Jesse Ingelevics had left the band. He was replaced by Jordan Hastings, late of the band Jersey.

At the MuchMusic Video Awards, the video for the song "Accidents" won Best Independent Video, and the band was nominated for the Peoples' Choice Award – Favourite Canadian Group. At the Juno Awards of 2005, Alexisonfire won the award for New Group of the Year.

Crisis (2006–2007)

On August 22, 2006, the band released their third studio album, Crisis, which received rave reviews and continues to be deemed 'important'.

The album's release was marked with a party on a boat on the River Thames in London, England. This also launched a 10-month world tour that took them through the UK, Australia, Canada and the US. They were now playing to crowds of up to 80,000 people, at the Reading and Leeds Festivals,  Festival d'été de Québec, and they headlined at the Brixton Academy in London. They played the Warped Tour, the Taste of Chaos tour, the Saints & Sinners Festival and Australia's Soundwave festival. At this point,  they were one of the most popular bands in Canada. 

The band toured with Anti-Flag, Saosin, The Bled, Norma Jean, Every Time I Die, Cancer Bats, Attack in Black, Moneen, Envy on the Coast, A Change of Pace, The Ghost of a Thousand and The Dear & Departed, among others.

The tour produced three live albums: Live At Brixton Academy (London, 11/13/07),   Live At Manchester Academy (11/14/07),   and Live At Birmingham Academy (now O2 Academy Birmingham) (11/16/07).
 
At this time, Pettit told a reporter: "The next record, I think, is us pretty much wanting to put the knife in screamo. I don't want to be the band that saves it, I want to be the band that kills it." Pettit later regretted making the statement.

At the 2006 CASBY Awards, Crisis won Favorite New Indie Release. At the 2007 MuchMusic Video Awards, the video for "This Could Be Anywhere in the World" won the award for Best Cinematography and was nominated for Best Rock Video. The band was also nominated for the Peoples' Choice Award – Favourite Canadian Group. At the Juno Awards of 2007, Crisis garnered a nomination for CD/DVD Artwork Design of the Year, Julius Butty received a Producer of the Year nomination for "This Could Be Anywhere in the World", and Alexisonfire was nominated for Group of the Year.

Old Crows/Young Cardinals and Dog's Blood (2008–2010)
In 2008, MacNeil told a Bombshell Zine interviewer: "Alexis hasn't broken up, but we'll see what happens. We are at a crossroads now." As a result, by 2009, rumours that Alexisonfire was about to break up abounded, but the band announced the name of their new album on February 1. They began recording Old Crows/Young Cardinals on the same day. By March 1st, the recording process was near completion and two songs were announced--"Midnight Regulations" and "Emerald St." On March 31, 2009, it was confirmed that Alexisonfire had signed to Dine Alone Records, whose founder, Joel Carriere, had once been the band's manager.

On April 20, Alexisonfire released the song "Young Cardinals" for radio airplay. The music video premiered on MuchOnDemand on May 15, 2009; the album was released on June 23, 2009, and was very well received.  

The band then went on a 300-date tour through Europe, the US and Canada, which lasted through December 2010.

In 2008, Dallas Green told Canoe.ca that he had sketched out new songs that he hoped would take the band into "new, weird territories". These songs would become the four-track EP Dogs Blood, which was released in 2010. The band announced the release of Dogs Blood at the 2009 Verge Awards, hosted by The Verge (XM), where Old Crows/Young Cardinals was nominated for Album of the Year and the band was nominated as Artist of the Year. At the Juno Awards of 2010, Old Crows/Young Cardinals was nominated as Rock Album of the Year.

On February 16, 2010, the band was set to play a free all-ages show at the 2010 Winter Olympics venue Live City Yaletown when, seconds into the show, the rush of the audience broke a barrier and people were trampled; 20 were slightly injured. Alexisonfire returned to Vancouver later that year as headliners at the PNE Forum.

Also in 2010, the band released a collection of six songs available exclusively through iTunes as a digital download. The EP, iTunes Originals, contained previously-recorded material from the group's discography, versions of some of their previously released songs performed slightly differently, and interviews with the band. On November 22, 2010, a digital version of their Aussie Tour 7" was released on iTunes. It contains two cover songs, originally by Midnight Oil and The Saints.

Disbandment and farewell tour (2011–2012)

In 2005, Dallas Green had launched a solo folk/rock side project called City and Colour. The project had become very successful and between that and his commitments to Alexisonfire, he said that he suffered a nervous breakdown and that being in Alexisonfire was killing him. At the end of the Old Crows/Young Cardinals tour, Green told the band that he was leaving Alexisonfire, but that he would not announce his departure until the rest of the band decided on their future plans.

On February 14, 2011, Alexisonfire tweeted that they had been writing new music for their fifth studio album, describing it as "so heavy it's going to make Dog's Blood look like a ska record". Despite these statements, the album did not materialize and on August 5, 2011, Alexisonfire announced their break-up. In the statement, George Pettit cited the departures of both Green and MacNeil (who left to become the vocalist for Gallows), and personal issues among the remaining members as reasons for breaking up. Pettit also described the break-up as not being "amicable". Alexisonfire planned on celebrating their tenth anniversary with one last headlining Canadian tour and "a series of releases", although Green had specifically said that, for him, their December 19, 2010, show in their hometown was their last concert.

In July 2012, Green stated he had been in contact with other ex-Alexisonfire members, and that he and MacNeil had been "starting to talk about doing some final [Alexisonfire] shows, because when we did play our last show nobody knew it was our last show." In December 2012, Alexisonfire embarked on their farewell tour. It was initially nine dates, but it expanded to 30, with stops in Canada, the UK, Australia and Brazil. In December, the EP Death Letter was released, featuring new interpretations of songs spanning the band's previous four albums.

On December 25, 2013, the band released a limited-edition vinyl box set containing all the four albums as well as EPs, LPs, B-sides etc. One thousand copies were produced; they were sold out in 30 minutes. In August 2014, they released a slightly smaller second edition of the boxed set.

Reunion and Otherness (2015–present)

On March 9, 2015, the band announced a reunion tour, their first since their farewell tour in 2012, including dates at Reading and Leeds festivals, Sonic Boom, Heavy Montréal, X-Fest and Riot Fest. On September 19, 2015, at Riot Fest in Toronto, Wade MacNeil announced on stage that the band was officially back. The band later clarified this statement, reaffirming they had "no immediate plans" regarding new music or tours together, however they've played 100 concerts since 2015.

On February 12, 2016, the band released Live at Copps, a recording of their performance on December 30, 2012, at the Copps Coliseum in Hamilton, Ontario, which was the last show of their 2012 farewell tour. The album was released for download through iTunes, as well as in a special 4-record set, and as a Blu-ray video.

On June 22, 2016, Alexisonfire was announced as the main headliner for the 2017 Unify Gathering in Victoria, Australia, and announced a tour with The Dirty Nil, Behind Crimson Eyes and The Getaway Plan through Australia and New Zealand. The band was then announced as a headliner at the annual Quebec festival Montebello Rock and, on February 27, 2017, the band made a surprise three-song appearance at the Toronto stop of Billy Talent's Afraid of Heights Tour. They played Toronto's Danforth Music Hall in December 2017, and spent the following June touring Germany and the UK before heading back to Canada to play the Festival d'été de Québec.

On February 1, 2019, the band posted a black image on their Facebook page. Later in the day, the band posted a teaser video featuring a building with a green neon light spelling out the words "Familiar Drugs". Later, on February 12, 2019, the band posted 3 illusive black pictures on their Instagram page. Fans soon figured out that by changing the brightness and contrast on these black pictures, it revealed the numbers 2,15 and 19. On February 15, 2019, the band released a new song called "Familiar Drugs", their first new material in nearly nine years. On April 16, 2019, the band released the music video for "Familiar Drugs," which was shot completely on VHS and cellphones.

On May 24, 2019, the band released another standalone single called "Complicit", followed by "Season of the Flood", on January 13, 2020.

Alexisonfire went out on a short tour in 2019, playing shows in London, New York City, Los Angeles and Toronto as well as a show at Ottawa Bluesfest. This was followed by 2020 performances in Winnipeg, Edmonton, Calgary, Vancouver and Seattle.

During the COVID-19 pandemic, the band hosting a special one-time watch party on YouTube, showing a filmed performance of the final show on their farewell tour in December 2012 in Hamilton, Canada. Starting before the livestream was the premiere of their music video for their song, "Season of the Flood", which is made up of footage shot exclusively by AOF concertgoers in Winnipeg, Edmonton, Calgary and Vancouver during the tour in January. 

In an interview with the Toronto Star in 2019, George Pettit revealed that, in 2015, he had become a professional firefighter and that, even though the band had reunited, that new career would be his priority. He also remains the lead singer in his side project, Dead Tired.
Wade MacNeil continues as the lead singer for Black Lungs and Gallows. On May 21, 2021, MacNeil presented his latest project, Doom’s Children with his first single and video, "Flower Moon".
Jordan Hastings continues with his long-time side project, Cunter.
Dallas Green has continued on with City and Colour, and with You+Me, his collaboration with Pink. 

In a June 2021 interview, Green stated that Alexisonfire was "trying to get all these new songs together for the first time in like ten years" implying that more new music was in the works. On March 10, 2022, the band announced their fifth studio album Otherness, their first album of new studio recordings in thirteen years. It was released on June 24, 2022.

Musical style and legacy
The band describes their music as "the sound of two Catholic high-school girls in mid-knife-fight"; in 2004, then-drummer Jesse Ingelevics described their sound as "Mogwai meets Sunny Day Real Estate". Others have described their music as post-hardcore, emo, melodic hardcore, and screamo.  The band members originally bonded over the myriad punk rock styles that their hometown scene consisted of, including moshcore, screamo, youth crew, crust punk and emo. Their music is unique for its use of three main vocalists: one clean (Green), one unclean (Pettit) and one serving as a combination of the two (MacNeil). Their 2009 album Old Crows / Young Cardinals saw a more prominent overall use of clean vocals, with Pettit also providing further clean vocals, having occasionally done so on Crisis. The band's first two albums include occasional spoken word vocals, also performed by Pettit.

Alexisonfire has been cited as an influence by bands such as Cancer Bats, Silverstein, Four Year Strong and 36 Crazyfists. Revolver Magazine additionally cited them as influencing the majority of the mid-2000s post-hardcore scene. Liam Cormier, lead vocalist of Cancer Bats, stated "everyone will always remember Alexisonfire and Billy Talent as the two bands that brought heavy music to the forefront and broke that scene wide open in this country." The band has also been well-regarded for their live performances throughout the years. Ex-frontman of Grade, Kyle Bishop, credited them for this in an interview with The Grid TO. "Previous to them, Canadian content was pretty lame, palatable stuff," he said. "Then you had Alexis come in, George shredding his larynx and smashing his face against the wall. They destroyed everything. And a lot of people gravitated to that, and I've never seen that happen in Canada before. They opened up the door for a lot of bands to be appreciated, and brought a whole new group of people into punk rock." In an article for Exclaim!, Ian Gormely praised the band for "opening doors for like-minded artists steeped in Southern Ontario's potent punk and metal scenes," and as having an "enduring influence in Canadian rock, and aggressive music in general".

Band members
Current members
 George Pettit – vocals , keyboards 
 Dallas Green – vocals, guitar ,  keyboards 
 Wade MacNeil –  guitar, vocals 
 Chris Steele – bass 
 Jordan Hastings – drums, percussion 

Current touring musicians
 Matt Kelly – keyboards, organ, synthesizers, pedal steel, backing vocals 

Former members
 Jesse Ingelevics – drums, percussion 

Former touring musicians
 Kenny Bridges – bass

Discography

Studio albums
 Alexisonfire (2002)
 Watch Out! (2004)
 Crisis (2006)
 Old Crows / Young Cardinals (2009)
 Otherness (2022)

Awards and nominations

References

External links

 Alexisonfire official website
 
 Alexisonfire CanadianBands.com entry
 Alexisonfire at Exclaim!
 Alexisonfire unofficial blog and forum
Alexisonfire cover story July 2009
Europunk: interview
Punk 76: interview
Leeds Music Scene: article
Spinner Interviews Alexisonfire
DINE ALONE RECORDS - View Releases

Canadian post-hardcore musical groups
Screamo musical groups
Musical groups from St. Catharines
Juno Award for Breakthrough Group of the Year winners
Musical groups established in 2001
Musical groups disestablished in 2011
Musical groups reestablished in 2012
Musical groups disestablished in 2012
Musical groups reestablished in 2015
Equal Vision Records artists
Defiance Records artists
Dine Alone Records artists
Hassle Records artists
2001 establishments in Ontario
2011 disestablishments in Ontario
2012 establishments in Ontario
2012 disestablishments in Ontario
2015 establishments in Ontario
Juno Award for Rock Album of the Year winners